Neustadt an der Waldnaab (Bavarian: Neistodt an da Woidnaab) is a municipality in Bavaria, Germany, and county seat of the district Neustadt an der Waldnaab.

Sister cities 
Neustadt an der Waldnaab has one sister city:

  Hays, Kansas, US

References

Neustadt an der Waldnaab (district)